Kingston Maurward College is a college for land-based studies situated two miles east of Dorchester, Dorset, England. The college is a member of the Landex group , an association of institutions that provide courses in agriculture and horticulture.

Kingston Maurward House on the college grounds is used for administration purposes and private functions.

See also
 Kingston Maurward House

External links
 Kingston Maurward College
 Landex group

Further education colleges in Dorset
Agricultural universities and colleges in the United Kingdom